This is a list of members of the Northern Territory Legislative Assembly from 2001 to 2005:

 Katherine CLP MLA Mike Reed resigned his seat on 12 September 2003. CLP candidate Fay Miller won the resulting by-election on 4 October.
 Goyder CLP MLA Peter Maley was expelled from the parliamentary wing of the Country Liberal Party on 19 May 2005. He served out the remainder of his term as an independent.

See also
2001 Northern Territory general election

Members of Northern Territory parliaments by term
21st-century Australian politicians